Los Bajos is a place name of Spanish origin.

Los Bajos, Chile
Los Bajos, Trinidad